Ee Abbai Chala Manchodu is a 2003 Telugu-language romantic comedy film directed by Agastyan and produced by B. V. S. N. Prasad. The film stars Ravi Teja, Sangeetha and Vani.

Plot 
Vivekananda (Ravi Teja) is the son of a rich businessman (Ajay Rathnam). He falls in love with a middle-class girl Bharathi (Vani). His father believes love means sharing worldly pleasures with a female and advises him to have carnal pleasure with his lover. Vivekananda believes love is pristine and sacred and it doesn't involve sex. Bharathi's mother (Sana) doesn't support their love as she believes every woman should be domineering and keep her husband in control and as Vivekananda is rich, she believes he won't let himself be dominated. Both decide to prove their parents wrong and leave their respective homes to live together without having sex. The rest of the story is how they prove their parents wrong and win their approval.

Cast

Music 

The music of the film was composed by M. M. Keeravani.

References

External links 
 

2003 films
2000s Telugu-language films
2003 romantic comedy films
Indian romantic comedy films
Films scored by M. M. Keeravani
Films directed by Agathiyan